Æthelwald (floruit 934x945–949x950) was Bishop of Dorchester. 

Æthelwald was consecrated between 934 and 945. He died between 949 and 950.

Æthelwald witnessed a number of charters under kings Edmund and Eadred. The date at which he became bishop is very uncertain, but it is reasonably sure that he died in about 950 when Bishop Oskytel begins to witness charters.

Citations

References

External links
 

Bishops of Dorchester (Mercia)
10th-century English bishops
Year of birth unknown